St. George Airport may refer to:

St George Airport (Queensland) in St George, Queensland, Australia (IATA: SGO)
St. George Airport (Alaska) in St. George, Alaska, United States (FAA: PBV, IATA: STG)
St. George Airport (South Carolina) in St. George, South Carolina, United States (FAA: 6J2)
St. George Regional Airport in St. George, Utah, United States (FAA/IATA: SGU)
St. George Municipal Airport (1972-2010) in St. George, Utah, United States (FAA/IATA: SGU)